Ohmden is a municipality in the district of Esslingen in Baden-Württemberg in Germany.

Neighboring communities
Neighboring municipalities are starting from North clockwise: Schlierbach, Hattenhofen, Zell unter Aichelberg , all district Göppingen and Holzmaden and Kirchheim unter Teck, both in the district of Esslingen.

Municipality arrangement
The municipality includes the village of Ohmden and the courtyards Lindenhof and Talhof.

History

Ohmden is the first time documented under the name "Amindon" in 1125 in San Rotulus Petrinus, a parchment of the monastery of the Abbey of Saint Peter in the Black Forest. It describes a barter transaction in which Conrad I, Duke of Zähringen assigned the place to the monastery. Later, the village fell to the monastery Adelberg. Ecclesiastical it belonged to Kirchheim unter Teck.
Since 1938 Ohmden belonged to the district Nürtingen, and since 1973 to the district of Esslingen.

Religions
Since the Reformation Ohmden is Protestant coined. To date, the majority of citizens are Protestant. However, there is since 2002 the Catholic Community Centre St. Markus, where regular Catholic services take place. St. Markus is affiliated to the Church St. Ulrich in Kirchheim unter Teck.

Mayor
1952–1986 Walter Kröner 
1987–2010 Manfred Merkle 
2010–2018 Martin Funk
since 2018 Barbara Born

Crest
The coat of arms shows Ohmden in black a six-pointed star with a horseshoe on a yellow shield. What is certain is that the star was a different area to crest with horseshoe symbol that repeatedly returned to Württemberg, introduced only to distinguish and has no historical significance. The current coat of arms was awarded on 11 December 1973 by the Ministry of the Interior  of Baden-Württemberg.

Education
Ohmden has its own primary school. Older students have to go to the neighboring towns to attend secondary schools.

Buildings
Especially worth seeing is the Protestant Church of St. Cosmas and Damian  from the 17th century. It contains four altar wings pictures of Thomas Schick, that show scenes from the life of the two Saints Cosmas and Damian and are built around 1500.

Fossil site
Fossils can be found at the Museum of Natural History Hauff in Holzmaden.

Sons and daughters of the town
Karl Scheufelen (1823-1902), entrepreneur, founder of Scheufelen paper mill in Lenningen.

Literature
 Hans Schwenkel: Heimatbuch des Kreises Nürtingen. Band 2. Würzburg 1953, S. 992–1005.
 Der Landkreis Esslingen. Hrsg. vom Landesarchiv Baden-Württemberg i.V. mit dem Landkreis Esslingen. Band 2, Jan Thorbecke Verlag, Ostfildern 2009, S. 325.
 Walter Kröner: Ohmdener Schicksale - 1920 bis 1950. Ohmden 1997,

References

Esslingen (district)
Municipalities in Baden-Württemberg